Trilogy of Terror is a 1975 American made-for-television anthology horror film directed by Dan Curtis and starring Karen Black. It features three segments, each based on unrelated short stories by Richard Matheson. The first follows a college professor who seeks excitement with her students; the second is about twin sisters who have a bizarre relationship.  These two segments were adapted by William F. Nolan. The third, adapted by Matheson himself, focuses on a woman terrorized by a Zuni fetish doll in her apartment. Black stars in all three segments, and plays dual roles in the second.

The film was first aired as an ABC Movie of the Week on March 4, 1975. Black initially turned down the project, but reconsidered when her then-husband, Robert Burton, was cast in the first segment "Julie". A television film sequel titled Trilogy of Terror II, written and also directed by Dan Curtis, was released in 1996.

Plots

"Julie"
Chad Rogers is a college student with a crush on his English teacher, Julie Eldridge. During one class, Chad is distracted by Julie's thigh as she sits on her desk, and he daydreams about her. Chad reveals his fantasies to his friend Eddie Nells, but Eddie discourages him from becoming romantically involved with teachers. Later that evening, when Julie is undressing in her room, Chad watches her through a window. The next day, he asks Julie out on a date. She initially refuses, but later accepts the offer.

During the date at a drive-in theater, Chad spikes Julie's drink, rendering her unconscious, and drives her to a motel. After checking them in as husband and wife, he photographs her in a variety of sexually provocative positions. He drives her home as she begins to regain consciousness, saying that she had fallen asleep during the movie.

After developing the photographs in his darkroom, Chad shows the pictures to Julie. She is furious and threatens to call the police. Chad blackmails Julie into submitting to his romantic attentions. After several weeks of this, Julie announces, "The game is over." She reveals that it was actually she who had manipulated Chad in an elaborate role play of her own design. "Did you really think that dull, little mind of yours could possibly have conceived any of the rather dramatic experiences we've shared? Why do you think you suddenly had the overwhelming desire to see what I looked like under 'all those clothes?' Don't feel bad ... I always get bored after a while." Chad realizes that Julie has poisoned his drink, and then he collapses. Julie drags him into the darkroom where she sets fire to the offending photographs.

Chad's death is later reported in local media as a house fire. Julie adds the newspaper story to a scrapbook of articles depicting students who met similar fates. There is a knock at the door, and another young handsome student in need of a tutor enters.

"Millicent and Therese"
This tale of sibling rivalry focuses on a pair of twin sisters, played by Karen Black.

Millicent is a repressed, unattractive, and prudish brunette; while her twin sister Therese, a worldly, seductive, and free-spirited blonde. Millicent greets Thomas, one of Therese's lovers, and questions him about the nature of some unspecified immoral event that happened during Thomas and Millicent's sexual relationship. Millicent confides to Dr. Ramsey (Millicent's friend and family therapist) that her sister has engaged in sex with their father and is holding her captive inside the family mansion, while gloating to Millicent about her deeds. Ramsey arrives one day to the mansion to speak with Therese, who comes on to Ramsey and furiously throws him out of the house when he refuses her advances.

Millicent writes a letter to Dr. Ramsey, explaining that she has determined that Therese is evil and that she needs to stop her even if that means losing her own life, and plans to use a voodoo doll to kill her. When Dr. Ramsey enters the house, he finds Therese dead on her bedroom floor with the doll next to her and Millicent nowhere to be found. Dr. Ramsey reveals, as the family doctor, that "Therese" and "Millicent" are the same person; Therese suffered from multiple personality disorder brought on by the fact that "Therese" slept with her father and subsequently killed her mother — and "Millicent" was an alternative personality with a repressed sexuality to cope with the horror of her actions. The recent death of the woman's father unhinged her further, and the "murder" was actually a form of suicide.

"Amelia"
"Amelia" was filmed like a one-woman play, with Karen Black as the only actor. It was also the only film of the three whose script was written by the original author of the story, Richard Matheson. "Amelia" is based on his 1969 short story, "Prey". The other two are based on stories by Matheson as well, but their teleplays were written by William F. Nolan.

Amelia lives alone in a high-rise apartment building. She returns home after a fateful shopping spree carrying a package containing a wooden fetish doll, crafted in the form of a misshapen aboriginal warrior equipped with nasty, pointed teeth and a spear. A scroll comes with the doll, claiming that the doll contains the actual spirit of a Zuni hunter named "He Who Kills", and that the gold chain adorning the doll keeps the spirit trapped within. As Amelia makes a call to her mother, we learn that she suffers from her mother's overbearing behavior. Amelia struggles to justify her independence and cancels their plans for the evening by claiming she has a date. As Amelia leaves the room, we see the Zuni doll's golden chain suddenly fall off.

Later, Amelia is preparing dinner, using a carving knife. She enters the darkened living room, and realizes the doll is not on the coffee table. Amelia hears a noise in the kitchen and when she investigates, the knife is missing. Returning to the living room, she is suddenly attacked by the doll, which stabs at her ankles viciously. She attempts to flee, but the doll chases her around the apartment. In the bathroom, Amelia envelops the doll in a towel and attempts futilely to drown it in the bathtub. She later traps it in a suitcase, but the doll begins cutting a circular hole through the top of suitcase with the butcher knife, but Amelia manages to stab it back into the suitcase. Thinking it might be dead, she slowly opens the case up, only to have it leap out and latch its teeth onto her arm. After managing to get it off her arm by smashing it into one of her lamps, it then latches onto her neck, but Amelia manages to detach it and hurl the doll into the oven where it catches fire. She holds the oven door while she listens to the doll howling and screaming as it burns and, while black smoke billows out, she waits until the screaming eventually stops. Opening the oven to ensure that the doll is "dead", she is struck by some force that pushes her backward and from which she emits a blood-curdling scream.

At some point after that, the audience sees Amelia (from behind) place another call to her mother. In a calm, controlled voice, she apologizes for her behavior during the previous call, and invites her mother to come over. She then rips the bolt from her front door and crouches down low in an animalistic manner, carrying a large carving knife. She is now seen frontally, stabbing at the floor with the weapon, grinning ferally and revealing the horrific teeth of the Zuni fetish doll, whose spirit now inhabits her body.

Cast
"Julie"
 Karen Black as Julie
 Robert Burton as Chad Rogers
 Jim Storm as Eddie Nells
 Gregory Harrison as the New Student
 Kathryn Reynolds as Anne Richards  
 Orin Cannon as Motel Clerk
 Tracy Curtis as Tracy

"Millicent and Therese"
 Karen Black as Millicent / Therese
 John Karlen as Thomas Amman
 George Gaynes as Dr. Chester Ramsey

"Amelia"
 Karen Black as Amelia
 Walker Edmiston (uncredited) as the voice of the Zuni doll

Production

Concept
All three of the segments in Trilogy of Terror are based on individual stories by horror writer Richard Matheson. The segments "Julie" and "Millicent and Therese" were adapted by William F. Nolan, while Matheson adapted "Amelia" into a teleplay himself. On January 4, 1975, it was reported that Karen Black had signed on to appear in the film, portraying the three central characters.

Filming
Filming for Trilogy of Terror took place on location in Hollywood, Los Angeles in the winter of 1974–1975.

Release
Trilogy of Terror first aired on ABC in the 8:30 p.m. time slot on March 4, 1975.

Critical response
The Boston Globe praised Karen Black's "tour-de-force performance" in the film upon its original airing. Black felt the film led to genre typecasting, forcing her to accept many roles in B-grade horror films following the film's release. She stated, "I think this little movie took my life and put it on a path that it didn't even belong in."

Jeremiah Kipp from Slant Magazine awarded the film 3.5 out of 4 stars, praising the film's direction, script, and Black's performance. On Black's performance, Kipp wrote, "Black plays the female protagonist in each story, and she’s the kind of extreme actress who not only acts with her eyes and face, but with her neck, her fingertips, her elbows, wrists, and torso. Gusto is not the word." Writing for AXS, Octavio Ramos deemed "Julie" a "lackluster story," but added: "Let’s face it, there’s only one real reason to watch Trilogy of Terror: The third segment of this made-for-television anthology, which features the famous Zuni fetish doll that comes to life and torments Karen Black. This segment alone makes Trilogy of Terror a must-own product for even the most casual horror fan."

Felix Vasquez from Cinema Crazed.com felt that the first two segments were "forgettable", and stated that only the last segment was "truly entertaining and creepy". Concluding his review, Vasquez wrote, "Trilogy of Terror was an all around disappointing film with a steady focus on psychological torment and less on actual terror or scares.  I wish I could join along with the crowd and praise this film, but I would have had to be entertained to do so." TV Guide offered the film similar criticism, awarding it 2/4 stars. The reviewer criticized the first two segments as being "utterly wash out" in terms of suspense, dialogue, and storytelling. However, the reviewer commended the final segment as being " a simple, engrossing and claustrophobic set-piece of fear". Meagan Navarro from Bloody Disgusting included Trilogy of Terror in her list of "10 Scariest Made For TV Horror Movies", praising the final segment as 'keeping the film forever at the forefront of made-for-television movie memory'.

Home video
Anchor Bay Entertainment released the film on DVD on August 24, 1999, and on VHS on July 11, 2000. A special edition DVD was released by Dark Sky Films/MPI Home Video on August 29, 2006. The film was released on Blu-ray and on DVD by Kino Lorber Studio Classics on October 16, 2018. Both Blu-ray and DVD are remastered in 4K.

Legacy
Trilogy of Terror has developed a cult following over the years and earned a reputation as a cult classic. It also helped establish Karen Black a devoted cult following as a performer in horror films.

The "Amelia" segment was the inspiration for the 1997 parodical short film, "Karen Black Like Me," which featured a gay man being terrorized by a possessed sex toy.

The Zuni Doll from the segment Amelia has been called by some as being "one of the scariest dolls in movie history".

In 2011, Complex magazine named Trilogy of Terror the fourth-greatest television film of all time, while MeTV deemed it the scariest television film of all time in 2016.

Sequel
A sequel titled Trilogy of Terror II was aired on October 30, 1996. The sequel was again directed by Dan Curtis, who also co-wrote the film, and starred Lysette Anthony.

See also
 List of American films of 1975
 Killer toy
 Attack of the Beast Creatures

References

External links 
 
 
 
 
 

1975 films
1975 horror films
1970s fantasy films
1975 television films
ABC Movie of the Week
1970s supernatural horror films
American supernatural horror films
Films based on works by Richard Matheson
Films based on short fiction
Films directed by Dan Curtis
Puppet films
Films shot in Los Angeles
American horror anthology films
American horror television films
Films based on multiple works
Films with screenplays by Richard Matheson
Poisoning in film
American serial killer films
1970s serial killer films
American psychological horror films
1970s psychological horror films
American ghost films
1970s ghost films
1970s English-language films
1970s American films
Films about dissociative identity disorder
Succubi in film